Anjila Tumbapo Subba (Nepali:एन्जिला तुम्बापो सुब्बा; born 28 May 1996) is a Nepali footballer who plays as a goal keeper for Armed Police Force and Nepali Women's National Team.

Early life 
Anjila Tumbapo Subba started playing football from the age of thirteen. She completed her +2 level from Siddartha Banasthali College and is currently enrolled in BBS degree in the same college. She started her career from Purbanchal Women's Football Team in 2011 from where she played some local tournaments. Her performance caught the eyes of various departmental sides which led the departmental sides to offer her a contract. Among the offer received she choose Armed Police Force – APF Women’s Football Team. She joined APF back in 2012 and now is first choice Goal Keeper of the Team.

Domestic career 
In domestic league, Anjila plays for Armed Police Force-APF Women's Football Team. She joined APF in 2012.

International career 
She is currently considered as the first choice Goal Keeper of Nepal National Women's Football Team. She played her debut match for Nepal in 2014 SAFF Championship held in India.

Achievements

Domestic career 
 Winner - NCELL Cup 2013
 Runner Up - National Women's League 2013
 Third - COAS International Women's Football Tournament 2014
 Runner Up - NCELL Cup 2014 
 Winner - 7th COAS International Women's Football Tournament 2019

International career 

 Winner - U14 AFC Regional Championship 2014
 Runner Up - SAFF Championship 2014
 Runner Up - SAFF Championship 2016
 Runner Up - Hero Gold Cup 2019
 Runner Up - SAFF Championship 2019
 Runner Up - NAZADA Cup 2019
 Runner Up - 13th South Asian Games 2019

References

Nepal women's international footballers
1996 births
Living people
Women's association football goalkeepers
Nepalese women's footballers
South Asian Games silver medalists for Nepal
South Asian Games medalists in football